Longitarsus vilis is a species of beetle in the subfamily Galerucinae that is can be found on Canary Islands, in such European countries as Portugal, Spain, and also on Italian islands such as Sardinia and Sicily and the Italian mainland. It can also be found in African countries such as Algeria and Morocco and is also common in Italian region of Calabria.

References

V
Beetles described in 1864
Beetles of Asia
Beetles of Europe
Taxa named by Thomas Vernon Wollaston